A'Becketts Creek is a perennial stream and a northern tributary of the Duck River and part of the Parramatta River catchment, in Sydney, New South Wales, Australia.

Geography 

Starting from its source, near the shopping centre at Merrylands, its upper reaches have been channelized and piped underground. It flows generally east northeast, then east, joining with Duck Creek at Clyde. to flow into the Duck River at Rosehill. In its lower reaches it is a tidal creek.

A'Becketts Creek forms part of the boundary of the suburbs of Harris Park to the north, and the suburbs of Granville and Clyde to the south.

History 

From circa 1860, brickmaking commenced along A'Becketts Creek, adjacent to Harris Park. The site of the former Goodlet & Smith brickworks and pit at Holroyd is now a park and residential area.

In 1943 A'Becketts Creek was the site of a famous murder, where a soldier murdered and dumped the body of a boy in the creek.

References

Further reading 

 
 

Creeks and canals of Sydney
Parramatta River